Tena is a municipality and town of Colombia in the Tequendama Province, part of the department of Cundinamarca. The municipality borders Bojaca in the north, La Mesa in the west, San Antonio del Tequendama in the east and El Colegio in the south. The southern border of Tena is formed by the Bogotá River.

Etymology 
In the Chibcha language, Tena means "Place of rest for the zipa".

History 
In the times before the Spanish conquest, Tena was inhabited by the Muisca. The area of Tena formed the western border region with the territories of the Panche.

Modern Tena was founded on December 11, 1607 by Borja.

Economy 
Main economical activities in Tena are agriculture, livestock farming and fishing.

References 

Municipalities of Cundinamarca Department
Populated places established in 1607
1607 establishments in the Spanish Empire
Muisca Confederation
Muysccubun